Joel Mugisha Mvuka (born 12 November 2002) is a Norwegian professional footballer who plays as a forward for Eliteserien club Bodø/Glimt, on loan from Ligue 1 club Lorient.

Club career
He spent his youth and senior career in Åsane. In the summer of 2021 Mvuka signed for FK Bodø/Glimt.

On 31 January 2023, Mvuka signed a four-and-a-half-year contract with the French club Lorient and was loaned back to FK Bodø/Glimt until the end of the 2022–23 season.

Personal life
Born in Bergen, Mvuka is of Burundian descent. Mvuka had to stop football for 8 months as a teenager due to heart irregularities, but returned after he was properly diagnosed.

Career statistics

Club

Honours
Bodø/Glimt
Eliteserien: 2021

References

External links
 

2002 births
Living people
Footballers from Bergen
Norwegian people of Rwandan descent
Norwegian footballers
Association football forwards
Eliteserien players
Norwegian First Division players
Åsane Fotball players
FK Bodø/Glimt players